The 2024 Greater Manchester mayoral election is scheduled to be held on 2 May 2024 to elect the Mayor of Greater Manchester. The election will take place the same day as council elections within the city region, including the election for the Mayor of Salford, as well as local elections across England and Wales and potentially  the next United Kingdom general election.

Background 
The Mayor of Greater Manchester serves as the directly elected leader of the Greater Manchester Combined Authority. The Mayor has power over an investment directly to the combined authority from the government of £30 million a year for 30 years from 2017. The Mayor also incorporates the Police and Crime Commissioner role of the Greater Manchester Police into their post. In addition to these, the mayor has authority over strategic housing planning, transport, adult educationand skills, social care and others.

The first ever election was held in 2017. The Labour candidate Andy Burnham was elected as the inaugural mayor; he was successful in his bid for re-election in 2021 with 67% in the first round, winning without a need to go to the second round.

Electoral system 
This election will be the first to use first past the post to elect the mayor as a result of the changes made by the Elections Act 2022, with previous elections in 2017 and 2021 using the supplementary vote system.

All registered electors living in Greater Manchester aged 18 or over on 2 May 2024 will be entitled to vote in the mayoral election. Those who are temporarily away from Greater Manchester (for example, away working, on holiday, in student accommodation or in hospital) will also be entitled to vote in the mayoral election. The deadline to register to vote in the election will be announced nearer the election.

Candidates

Labour Party
Andy Burnham has been the mayor of Greater Manchester since 2017 and before that the Member of Parliament (MP) for Leigh from 2001 to 2017. There has been heavy speculation that Burnham will re-stand as a MP and bid to become a future Labour leader. Burnham has repeatedly stated that he will complete a full second term of the mayoralty and has not specified beyond that point. Burnham was a candidate for Labour Party leadership in 2015 and in 2010. After joining the Labour Party in January 2022, former professional footballer Gary Neville was linked with a potential run as Greater Manchester mayor, which he refused to rule out.

References

G
Elections in Greater Manchester
Mayoral elections in England
May 2024 events in the United Kingdom
2020s in Greater Manchester